Nuclear Jellyfish is the eleventh novel by American author Tim Dorsey. It was released January 25, 2009.

Plot summary
Nuclear Jellyfish features Dorsey's character Serge A. Storms. A mentally-disturbed vigilante anti-hero, Storms travels across Florida with sidekick Coleman to mete out his own brand of justice to miscreants, scammers and criminals while seeking out landmarks related to iconic rock band Lynyrd Skynyrd 

The novel finds Storms crossing paths with a brutal killer who calls himself "The Eel" -- but who behind is back is called "The Jellyfish" due a misshapen eel tattoo. In the meantime, Storms's nemesis Detective Mahoney complicates matters and a coin and stamp convention draws attention due to valuable collectibles. 

2008 American novels
Novels by Tim Dorsey
HarperCollins books